The Pontifical Catholic University of Puerto Rico School of Architecture is an institution of higher learning granting degrees in the field of architecture. It is located in the Ponce Historic Zone, across from Plaza Las Delicias. It was established in 2009. Together with the School of Law, it is one of two semi-autonomous professional colleges of the Pontifical Catholic University of Puerto Rico (PCUPR) in the city of Ponce, Puerto Rico. In 2010, the school won an award from the Southern Puerto Rico Chamber of Commerce for Valor del Año en Educacion (Courage of the Year in Education). The school is accredited by the National Architectural Accrediting Board (NAAB). It has a teaching staff of 40 and a student body of 300. The current dean of the school is Luis Badillo Lozano.

History
The history of the school dates back to 2007 when a group of Puerto Rican professionals got together and toyed with the idea of creating a school of architecture to serve southern Puerto Rico. A formal proposal was reviewed by ex-governor Rafael Hernandez Colon, who, at the time, was a member of the Board of Trustees of the PCUPR. Hernandez Colon presented the plan to the Board and it received unanimous approval.  After securing facilities, personnel, and other fundamentals, the school opened its doors in August 2009.

The Pontifical Catholic University of Puerto Rico School of Architecture is the third architecture school established in Puerto Rico. It is located in downtown Ponce, about half a mile from the main campus of the university at Las Americas Avenue. It was founded in August 2009.

Facilities
The school is located at the historic Forteza Building on Atocha street, between Cristina and Isabel streets, in front of Plaza Las Delicias. It was the result of a 14 million dollar investment.  With some $4 million in high-tech equipment "it is one of the most modern [architecture schools] in the Caribbean. The renovation and programmatic adaptation of the historic Forteza building was designed by architect Segundo Cardona FAIA (SCF Architects). The project won the 2010 Honor Mention (Built Project Category) from the American Institute of Architects (AIA), Puerto Rico Chapter. 

Students at the School of Architecture enjoy all of the resources of the Pontifical Catholic University of Puerto Rico. The University offers an array of physical activities including fitness classes; weight training; jogging track; basketball and outdoor pool. It also benefits from its location in the city of Ponce, home to various architectural styles dating back several centuries and including the likes of museums, churches, theaters, pompous homes - even a castle.

Mission
The stated mission of the school is "to educate and forge a new architect, planner, thinker and entrepreneur in an interdisciplinary environment; one within which the understanding of the territorial and urban complexity , as well as the regional,  and global economic dynamics operate with advanced technologies and knowledge to guide sustainable investments and interventions."

Programs
The 5-year architecture program at the school leads to a Bachelor of Architecture.  It is currently the only program the school offers.

See also

 Pontifical Catholic University of Puerto Rico
 Pontifical Catholic University of Puerto Rico at Mayagüez
 Ponce School of Medicine
 Ponce, Puerto Rico

References

External links
 Pontifical Catholic University of Puerto Rico School of Architecture (Spanish language)

Architecture schools in Puerto Rico
Catholic universities and colleges in Puerto Rico
Educational institutions established in 2009
Universities and colleges in Ponce, Puerto Rico
Pontifical Catholic University of Puerto Rico
2009 establishments in Puerto Rico
Education in Ponce, Puerto Rico